The 1984–85 season of the European Cup Winners' Cup was won by Everton in the final against Rapid Wien.

Everton also won the English Football League that season and would therefore have entered the European Cup the following season. However, Everton were unable to do so due to the newly enacted 5-year ban on English clubs participating in European competitions as a consequence of the Heysel stadium disaster in May of the same year. Everton's 1985 trophy win was therefore the last English club success in European competition until Manchester United won this competition again in 1991.

This would also be the last time Everton participated in European competition until the 1995–96 UEFA Cup Winners' Cup, following its 1994–95 FA Cup win.

First round

{{TwoLegResult|Siófoki Bányász ||1–3|AEL'|GRE|1–1|0–2}}

|}

1The return leg of the Dynamo Moscow-Hajduk Split tie was played at Gradski Vrt Stadium in Osijek instead of Hajduk Split's home ground in Split due to the club being punished by UEFA over a bizarre incident before their 1983–84 UEFA Cup semifinal first leg match against Tottenham Hotspur, when a Hajduk fan ran onto the pitch prior to kickoff with a live rooster and killed it by snapping its neck. Part of the punishment for Hajduk Split was being required to play home matches at least 300 km away from their home stadium.

First leg

Second legĦamrun Spartans won 3–1 on aggregate.Everton won 1–0 on aggregate.Bayern Munich won 6–2 on aggregate.Trakia Plovdiv won 5–1 on aggregate.Roma won 1–0 on aggregate.4–4 on aggregate. Wrexham won on away goals.Fortuna Sittard won 3–0 on aggregate.Wisła Kraków won 7–3 on aggregate.Dynamo Dresden won 4–3 on aggregate.Metz won 6–5 on aggregate.Rapid Wien won 5–2 on aggregate.Celtic won 3–1 on aggregate.AELwon 3–1 on aggregate.Servette won 6–1 on aggregate.Dynamo Moscow won 6–2 on aggregate.Internacionál Slovnaft Bratislava won 2–1 on aggregate.Second round

|}

Notes
Note 1: The 2nd leg in the Rapid Wien–Celtic tie was replayed at Old Trafford, Manchester, after a Rapid player Rudolf Weinhofer claimed to have been injured by an object thrown by a Celtic supporter. Celtic had won the original tie 3–0 with McClair, MacLeod, and Burns in the 32nd, 45th, and 68th minutes respectively. (Report)

First leg

Second legBayern Munich won 4–3 on aggregate.Roma won 3–0 on aggregate.Everton won 4–0 on aggregate.Fortuna Sittard won 3–2 on aggregate.Dynamo Dresden won 3–1 on aggregate.AEL won 3–1 on aggregate.Dynamo Moscow won 6–0 on aggregate.The match was voided following a disciplinary investigation by UEFA and a series of appeals due to reported incidents during the contest. Over a month later, a replay was ordered at a neutral venue at least 300km away from Glasgow.Rapid Wien won 4–1 on aggregate.Quarter-finals

|}

First leg

Second legBayern Munich won 4–1 on aggregate.Everton won 5–0 on aggregate.Rapid Wien won 5–3 on aggregate.Dynamo Moscow won 1–0 on aggregate.Semi-finals

|}

First leg

Second legEverton won 3–1 on aggregate.Rapid Wien won 4–2 on aggregate.''

Final

Top scorers
The top scorers from the 1984–85 UEFA Cup Winners' Cup are as follows:

See also
1984–85 European Cup
1984–85 UEFA Cup

References

External links
 1984-85 competition at UEFA website
 Cup Winners' Cup results at Rec.Sport.Soccer Statistics Foundation
 Cup Winners Cup Seasons 1984-85–results, protocols

3
UEFA Cup Winners' Cup seasons